Pizzo Quadro is a mountain of the Lepontine Alps on the Swiss-Italian border. With an elevation of 2,793 metres above sea level, it is the highest summit of the range lying south of the Wandfluhhorn and the Guriner Furggu (2,323 m). Pizzo Quadro is located between the localities of San Rocco di Prèmia (Piedmont) and Campo (Ticino).

SOIUSA classification 
According to the SOIUSA (International Standardized Mountain Subdivision of the Alps) the mountain can be classified in the following way:
 main part = Western Alps
 major sector = North Western Alps
 section = Lepontine Alps
 subsection = Ticino and verbano Alps
 supergroup = Catena Basodino-Cristallina-Biela
 group = Catena Fiorera-Biela-Corona di Groppo
 subgroup = Gruppo Corona del Groppo-Pizzo Quadro
 code = I/B-10.II-A.3.c

References

External links
 Pizzo Quadro on Hikr

Lepontine Alps
Mountains of the Alps
Mountains of Switzerland
Mountains of Piedmont
Mountains of Ticino
Two-thousanders of Italy
Italy–Switzerland border
International mountains of Europe
Two-thousanders of Switzerland